The following is a list of fictional astronauts on moonbases and performing other feats of lunar exploration not yet achieved.

Moon

See also
 Moon landings in fiction
 Moon in science fiction
 List of appearances of the Moon in fiction

Notes

References

Lists of fictional astronauts
Fiction set on the Moon